Utica is an unincorporated community in Bryan County, Oklahoma, United States. Utica has a post office with ZIP code 74763.

Demographics

References

Unincorporated communities in Bryan County, Oklahoma
Unincorporated communities in Oklahoma